Ratus Frei (September 8, 1932 – 1984) was a Swiss former ice hockey player who competed for the Swiss national team at the 1956 Winter Olympics in Cortina d'Ampezzo.

References

External links
Ratus Frei statistics at Sports-Reference.com

1932 births
1984 deaths
Ice hockey players at the 1956 Winter Olympics
Olympic ice hockey players of Switzerland
Swiss ice hockey left wingers